Johann Friedrich Reichardt (25 November 1752 – 27 June 1814) was a German composer, writer and music critic.

Early life

Reichardt was born in Königsberg, East Prussia, to lutenist and Stadtmusiker Johann Reichardt (1720–1780). Johann Friedrich began his musical training, in violin, keyboard, and lute, as a child. He was a student of Timofey Belogradsky, who in turn was a student of Sylvius Leopold Weiss. When Reichardt was ten years old, his father took the choir in which he sang, the "Wunderknaben", on a concert tour in East Prussia.

After being encouraged by Immanuel Kant, Reichardt later studied Jurisprudence and Philosophy in his hometown and in Leipzig from 1769 to 1771. In 1771, he escaped civil service by embarking on a Sturm-und-Drang tour as a virtuoso. He returned to Königsberg in 1774 and became the Kammersekretär (Chamber Secretary) in Ragnit. After Reichardt sent his opera Le feste galanti as a sample piece to Friedrich II, he was appointed to the position of the Royal Prussian Court Kapellmeister, a position previously held by Carl Heinrich Graun. 

Two years later, he already withdrew from the job and married the singer, pianist and Lieder composer Juliane Benda, a daughter of Frantisek Benda. Of their progeny was one daughter, Louise Reichardt (11 April 1779, Berlin – 17 November 1826, Hamburg), who became a noted songwriter, and a son, Wilhelm (1777–1782).

Later career
On the return from his first trip to Italy in 1783, Reichardt stopped in Vienna, where he met Kaiser Joseph II and Christoph Willibald Gluck. Further musical trips to France and England did not produce anticipated success; he therefore returned reluctantly to Berlin. In 1786, he developed close friendships with Johann Wolfgang von Goethe, Johann Gottfried Herder, Friedrich Schiller and Johann Georg Hamann. A small collection of his writings is in the hands of his family, specifically, Dagmar Reichardt (* 1961).

Further attempts to gain new ground in Paris failed, yet he had become zealous with revolutionary ideas. After the appearance of his Vertrauten Briefe (Intimate Letters) in 1792, he was released in 1794 without pay from his position as Court Kapellmeister for being sympathetic to the French Revolution. He lived first in Hamburg, where he released the journal Frankreich, but from 1794, he lived in Giebichenstein near Halle. In 1796, he was pardoned for his support of the revolution and appointed to the post of the director of the saline (salt mine) in Halle. From there, he often traveled to Berlin to lead the premieres of his compositions.

Another trip to Paris in 1802 lessened his fascination for the French and French politics considerably: he became an opponent of Napoleon. Four years later, when his manor was plundered by French troops, he fled to Danzig where he was active as a patriot and freedom fighter. Napoleon's brother Jérôme, located in Kassel, allowed Reichardt to return and named him to Theater Director in 1807. This lasted only nine months. In November 1809, he traveled to Vienna looking for success. After experiencing the music of Haydn, Mozart and Beethoven, he became receptive to the Viennese Classic, although he was too late. However, he soon returned to Giebichenstein where he died alone, from a gastric illness. His stage works were quickly forgotten after his death but his strophic Lieder and Ballads im Volkston (in folk style) enjoyed considerable popularity beyond the 19th century, aided by the Wandervogel movement.

Works
Much of Reichardt's reputation as a composer rests on his Lieder that number about 1500, using texts by some 125 poets. Important among these are the settings of Goethe's texts, some of which were known to, and influenced, Schubert.  He was also known by his Singspiele, a genre that he refined with Goethe's support. He also wrote 49 songs to Herder's texts. Aside from his music, his work as an essayist has maintained its value up to this day. The collection of poems Des Knaben Wunderhorn is, in the epilogue, dedicated to Reichardt. This was probably in the expectation that he would set the text to music. However, such a setting from Reichardt was never composed.

Stage works
See List of works for the stage by Johann Friedrich Reichardt.

Writings
Briefe eines aufmerksamen Reisenden, die Musik betreffend (1774–76) (Letters of an observant traveler, as it pertains to music)
Über die deutsche komische Oper (1774) (About German Comic opera)
Musikalische Kunstmagazin (1781–1792) (Musical Art Magazine)
Studien für Tonkünstler und Musikfreunde (1793) (Studies for musicians and music enthusiasts)
Vertraute Briefe aus Paris (1804) (Intimate letters from Paris)
Vertraute Briefe aus Wien (1810) (Intimate letters from Vienna)
Other writings on music and his travels

References
Warrack, John and West, Ewan (1992), The Oxford Dictionary of Opera, 782 pages,

External links
 

1752 births
1814 deaths
German opera composers
Male opera composers
Musicians from Königsberg
University of Königsberg alumni
Leipzig University alumni
Recipients of German pardons
German Classical-period composers
Music directors of the Berlin State Opera
General directors of the Berlin State Opera
German music critics
German male non-fiction writers
German male classical composers
19th-century German male musicians